Southern Maid (foaled 1911 in Kentucky) was a Thoroughbred Champion racehorse and successful broodmare who raced in Canada and the United States. Bred by John E. Madden, one of the most influential breeders in American horse racing history, her sire was the 1898 Kentucky Derby winner, Plaudit. Grandsire Himyar was also the sire of U.S. Racing Hall of Fame inductee Domino.

Purchased by Canadian businessman Robert T. Davies of Toronto, Southern Maid was trained by future Canadian Horse Racing Hall of Fame inductee John Nixon. In 1913, Southern Maid was the dominant filly in racing, both in Canada and the United States. She regularly beat her male counterparts in races that drew some of the best horses in North America. Her wins included the Victoria Stakes at Old Woodbine Race Course in Toronto, and the Nursery Plate at the Hamilton Jockey Club course in Hamilton, Ontario, in which she defeated Edward R. Bradley's colt Black Toney.  Up against another field dominated by males, Southern Maid ran second to H. P. Whitney's colt, Pennant, in the Futurity Stakes, held that year at Saratoga Race Course.

Southern Maid's 1913 performances earned her retrospective American Champion Two-Year-Old Filly honors and, in the pre-Sovereign Award era, the de facto Canadian Champion Two-Year-Old Filly. Racing at age three, Southern Maid met with limited success.

Breeding record
Southern Maid served as a broodmare for the Davies family Thorncliffe Stable. She notably foaled:
 Captain Scott - won the 1921 Coronation Futurity Stakes
 South Shore - 1922 winner of Canada's most prestigious race, the King's Plate.
 Trail Blazer - won the 1923 Breeders' Stakes

Pedigree

References
 Southern Maid's pedigree and partial racing stats
July 30, 1913 Toronto World newspaper article on Southern Maid's win in the Victoria Stakes

1911 racehorse births
Thoroughbred family 12-b
Racehorses bred in Kentucky
Racehorses trained in Canada
American Champion racehorses